Antonio Díaz is one of the eleven municipalities of Isla Margarita in the state of Nueva Esparta, Venezuela. It's located at the center-east of the Island, and it has an area of 165.9 Km². In the year 2011, had a population of 71,466 inhabitants. Its capital is the town of San Juan Bautista, located at the valley of the same name.

History 

In 1525, ancient settlers from Cubagua Island looking for fresh water, arrived to the Valley of San Juan, attracted by several freshwater springs, mild weather and fertile lands suitable for raising livestock and planting, made the decision of settle down. In 1529, San Juan Bautista was founded, the first Spanish commune of the Margarita Island, by Pedro de Alegría who was Francisco Fajardo successor, and the first European settler of the Island who established himself in San Juan, where he founded a estate of cattle while he was Lieutenant and Governor of Margarita and representative of the heirs of Marcelo Villalobos.

Municipalities of Nueva Esparta
Margarita Island

Referencias